Jazeera Airways K.S.C is a Kuwaiti budget airline with its head office on the grounds of Kuwait International Airport in Al Farwaniyah Governorate, Kuwait. It operates scheduled services in the Middle East, Nepal, Pakistan, Bangladesh, India, Sri Lanka and Europe. Its main base is Kuwait International Airport. The airline has grown since its launch to become Kuwait's second national airline.
Jazeera Airways is one of the largest operators at Kuwait airport, having handled a quarter of all aircraft movements and passengers at the airport during July 2009.
According to the July 2009 report issued by Kuwait Directorate General for Civil Aviation's, Jazeera Airways had the largest number of aircraft movement in the month with 1834 take-offs and landings, overpassing the second-largest carrier in aircraft movement by 4% .

History
In 2004 the Kuwait Government permitted the establishment of the non-governmental airline firm, essentially ending Kuwait's 50-year-old dependency on Kuwait Airways. The 2004 Emiree Decree #89 established Jazeera Airways as the first airline to enter this newly liberalized industry. 
 
Jazeera Airways raised its capital of KD 10 million (US$35 million) through an initial public offering in Kuwait that was oversubscribed 12 times. The capital was doubled to KD 20 million (US$70 million) in 4Q 2007 by a second offering to existing shareholders. In May 2009, a share distribution of 10% effectively increased the capital to KD 22 million (US$77 million).

About 26% of the airline is owned by two companies affiliated with the Boodai Group: Wings Finance (9%) and Boodai Projects (17%). 6-7% is also held by Jasem M. al-Mousa Trading, a company owned by a former Minister of Public Works in the first Kuwaiti government established after the end of Iraq's invasion of Kuwait. About 17.5% is held by two real estate companies, and the rest is publicly held.

Jazeera Airways started operations on 30 October 2005 with a fleet of brand new Airbus A320 aircraft, all leather seats, flying to several destinations in the Middle East.

In Q2 2009, UAE authorities requested the airline to terminate its hub operations in Dubai. This step was seen as a support to Dubai's upcoming launch of its own low-cost airline, FlyDubai. Jazeera changed its operation model by concentrating on its Kuwait hub and trying to launch a second hub somewhere else. By Q2 2010, the new model proved unprofitable as the Kuwait hub suffered from overcapacity. The airline changed its plans by cancelling many stations and parking some aircraft which were later returned to lessor.

Destinations 

Jazeera Airways flies to destinations across the Middle East and Europe from its base in Kuwait. Since 2018, the company has expanded its available routes.

In October 2019, Jazeera Airways launched its first flight to London, bringing the first new service from Kuwait to the UK in 55 years. It operates the flight to London Gatwick Airport's South Terminal with its newest A320neo aircraft.

On 24 February 2021 the airline started flying to Colombo, Sri Lanka.

Dedicated terminal 
In 2018, Jazeera Airways opened its own dedicated terminal at Kuwait International Airport. The facility is claimed to be the first owned, built and operated by a private airline in the Middle East. It features a dedicated check-in hall for Jazeera passengers, a business class lounge, direct access to Jazeera boarding gates, and a car park with 350 spaces connected by a sky bridge.

Fleet
The Jazeera Airways fleet consists of the following aircraft (as of October 2022):

The last of the A320s was delivered by Airbus on 9 January 2010.

The airline's fleet is powered by CFM56-5B engines. All Jazeera Airways aircraft are fitted with 165 leather seats, and split into two cabins: Jazeera and Jazeera Business. When Jazeera business is offered, six seats are removed to provide 12 Plus seats in addition to 147 Economy seats.

Jazeera Airways ordered 30 Airbus A320s on 18 June 2007. This was announced at the Paris Air Show bringing its total orders up to 35 Airbus A320s.

During 2010, due to the airline's change of operation plans, several aircraft were parked, and eventually, five were returned to lessor Sahaab which subsequently leased them to Virgin America and SriLankan Airlines.

In April 2011, Jazeera Airways canceled 25 of the 40 A320s it ordered in 2007. Jazeera took delivery of four A320s still on order from 2012 to 2014.

In 2018, Jazeera Airways took deliveriy of the first Airbus A320neo aircraft in the Middle East and employed it on their Dubai route.
In September 2019 Jazeera also planned to order the A321LR. They also started their longest A320 family route which is 6 hours from its hub in Kuwait to London Gatwick

Cabins
The airline offers business and economy class seating. The economy class seating has leather seats and shareable TV screens. Business-class seats have leather seats and personal TV screens and two seats per row.

Jazeera Airways is one of the few airlines which does not serve alcoholic beverages on its flights.

Incidents
On 2 August 2018, Jazeera flight (J9 608) from Kuwait caught fire in its right engine on landing at Hyderabad. All 145 passengers were evacuated safely and the fire was extinguished.

References

External links
Official website

Airlines of Kuwait
Airlines established in 2004
2004 establishments in Kuwait
Kuwaiti brands
Low-cost carriers
Kuwaiti companies established in 2004
Multinational companies headquartered in the United Arab Emirates